Hugo Blanco (September 25, 1940 – June 14, 2015) was a popular Venezuelan musician. He is best known as the author of "Moliendo Café" and other songs like "El Burrito Sabanero", "Leche Condensada", "Luces de Caracas", "Sierra Nevada" and "Mañanita Zuliana". "Moliendo Café", written in 1958 when Hugo Blanco was only 18 years old, has become one of the most recognized Venezuelan songs in the world.

Biography
Blanco was born in Caracas, Venezuela. He purchased his first musical instrument known as a cuatro at the age of 15 and learned to play it listening to the radio. Blanco created a new Venezuelan music style ‒ a fusion of Cuban music and joropo ‒ called "the orquídea" in honor of the Venezuelan national flower.

In the 1960s, Blanco composed many popular gaitas with Simón Díaz called Gaitas de las Locas. He also founded what is widely considered to be the first Venezuelan ska group, Las Cuatro Monedas.

In the 1970s, he founded the Venezuelan group Los Hijos De Ña Carmen.

Hugo Blanco's song "La Vecina" was featured in an episode of the popular TV series Miami Vice.

"Moliendo Café" has become a popular chant for football fans around the world. The chant is widely known as "Dale Cavese" and has the same tune as the song.

Discography 
Tropicana, Fiesta Record Company, New York, FLP 1451/Polydor (Germany) 1964
El Nuevo Ritmo Moliendo Cafe
El Nuevo Ritmo Orquídea
Hugo Blanco
1° Premio del Festival Universitario de Música: "La India Tibaire"
Percusión
Balada del Bombardino
Selección Navideña
Me Gusta
Más Ritmo!!
Bailables con Hugo Blanco
Bailables con Hugo Blanco N°2
Bailables con Hugo Blanco N°3 "La Chispita"
Bailables con Hugo Blanco N°4
Bailables con Hugo Blanco N°5
Bailables con Hugo Blanco N°6
Superbailables con Hugo Blanco N°7
Bailables con Hugo Blanco N°8
Bailables con Hugo Blanco N°9: "Agua Fresca"
Bailables con Hugo Blanco N°10
Bailables con Hugo Blanco N°11
Bailables con Hugo Blanco N°12
Bailables con Hugo Blanco N°13
Sierra Nevada
Arpa Brava
La Música de Hugo Blanco
En Trinidad
La Rondallita
Lo Mejor de Hugo Blanco y su Arpa Viajera
La Parranda de Hugo Blanco
De Fiesta...
Tania con Hugo Blanco
El Poder de Hugo Blanco
El Sabor de Hugo Blanco
Los Hijos de Ña Carmen
Arpa Navideña
Festival Tropical
El Rapidito

With Simón Díaz
Lila + Hugo + Simón
Ya Llegó........Simón
De Parranda con...
Criollo y Sabroso
Gaitas y Parrandas con....
Gaita 70
Gaita 71
En Salsa
La Gaita de las Cuñas
Las Gaitas de Simón
Culpable?
Cuñas, Locas, Borrachitos
Las Gaitas de Simón 5
Las Gaitas de Simón 6

With Joselo Díaz
Las Gaitas de Joselo
Yo, soy el Rey!
Las Gaitas de Joselo "La Gaita del Brujo"
Las Gaitas de Joselo "La Gaita del Barbero"
Las Gaitas de Joselo "La Gaita de Joselito"
Las Gaitas de Joselo "La Gaita del Presidente"
Las Gaitas de Joselo "La Gaita de los Portugueses"
Las Gaitas de Joselo con Danielita
Las Gaitas de Joselo "La Gaita de los Artistas"
Las Gaitas de Joselo "La Gaita Gallega"

Compilations 
La Rondallita / El Burrito de Belen
La Historia
Nueva Rondallita
La Historia
Sus Grandes Éxitos
Bailables de Oro
Colección de Éxitos
Colección de Éxitos Vol.2
Colección de Éxitos Vol.3
Colección de Éxitos Vol.4
Colección de Éxitos Vol.5
Colección de Éxitos Vol.6
Colección de Éxitos Vol.7
Colección de Éxitos Vol.8
Colección de Éxitos Vol.9
Colección de Éxitos Vol.10
Colección de Éxitos Vol.11
Colección de Éxitos Vol.12
Colección de Éxitos Vol.13
Colección de Éxitos Vol.14
Colección de Éxitos Vol.15
Lo Mejor de las Mariposas
Caracha Negro with Simón Díaz

References

External links
 

1940 births
2015 deaths
Musicians from Caracas
Venezuelan composers
Venezuelan folk harpists
Venezuelan folk musicians
Venezuelan film score composers
Male film score composers